A reuptake modulator, or transporter modulator, is a type of drug which modulates the reuptake of one or more neurotransmitters via their respective neurotransmitter transporters. Examples of reuptake modulators include reuptake inhibitors (transporter blockers) and reuptake enhancers.

See also
 Releasing agent
 Release modulator
 Transporter substrate
 Channel modulator
 Enzyme modulator
 Receptor modulator

References

Drugs by mechanism of action
Psychopharmacology